The Windtech Pulsar is a Spanish single-place paraglider that was designed and produced by Windtech Parapentes of Gijón. It is now out of production.

Design and development
The aircraft was designed as a sports intermediate glider, to replace the Windtech Serak in the company line. The models are each named for their approximate wing area in square metres.

The design was optimized for strength, using V-ribs to reduce the line count for lower drag and higher speed.

The glider wing is made from Porcher Marine Skytex 45 g/m2 nylon fabric. The rib reinforcements are 180 g/m2 Dacron, with the trailing edge reinforcement fabricated of 175 g/m2 polyester. The lines are all sheathed Kevlar and 1.1 and 1.7 mm in diameter. The risers are made from 20 mm wide Polyamida strapping.

Variants
Pulsar 23
Small-sized model for lighter pilots. The glider model is AFNOR Standard certified.
Pulsar 25
Mid-sized model for medium-weight pilots. The glider model is Deutscher Hängegleiterverband e.V. (DHV) 1-2 certified.
Pulsar 27
Large-sized model for heavier pilots. The glider model is DHV 1-2 certified.
Pulsar 30
Extra large-sized model for much heavier pilots. The glider model is DHV 1-2 certified.

Specifications (Pulsar 25)

References

External links

Pulsar
Paragliders